The ambassador of Afghanistan to China is the official representative of the Islamic Emirate of Afghanistan to the People's Republic of China.

List of representatives

References 

 
China
Afghanistan